Rimbunan Hijau is a Malaysian multinational logging corporation controlled by Malaysian businessman Tiong Hiew King. The company has operations in many countries, including Malaysia, Indonesia, Papua New Guinea, Equatorial Guinea, Gabon, Vanuatu, New Zealand and Russia.

In Papua New Guinea, Rimbunan Hijau is the single biggest logging operator, and runs the country's biggest sawmill. It also owns one of the two major newspapers in the country, The National.

The company was established in 1975 and has an estimated annual turnover of more than US$1 billion, according to Malaysia-China Business Council.

Businesses 

The group's core business activities are:
Forestry
Upstream and Downstream Timber Operations
Reforestation
Oil Palm Plantations
Plantation & Processing Operations
Media
Newspaper & Magazine Publication
Malaysian Newsprint Industries (minority share)
ICT
Information Communication Technologies
Hardware & Software
Hospitality
Hotel Operations
Tourism and Leisure Ventures
Others
Property Development—Tiong Toh Siong Group of Companies
Stingless Bee Farming (Meliponiculture)
Trading & Retail Services
Plastic Manufacturing
Aquaculture
Biotech
Oil & Gas
Mining
Toll Road Collection
Tyres Retreading
Insurance Services
Education (Learning Mandarin) -- "Zhong Hua Han Yu"
 Human Capital Development—Rimbunan Hijau Academy
 Engineering & Construction

By country

Equatorial Guinea 

According to Greenpeace Rimbunan Hijau is the dominant player in the logging sector in Equatorial Guinea by the subsidiary Shimmer International. Rimbunan Hijau was in 1999 also logging contractor for Teodorin Obiang, the agriculture and forests minister of Equatorial Guinea and the son of president.

Controversy 
Rimbunan Hijau has been heavily criticized by environmental and humanitarian organizations for alleged human rights abuses, ignoring indigenous peoples Human rights, political corruption and negligence of the environment. A recent World Bank report estimates that up to 70 percent of logging in Papua New Guinea is illegal, further adding to the criticism.

Two groups that have made investigations and held protests against the company are Greenpeace and Rainforest Action Network. Rimbunan Hijau in turn has threatened to sue Greenpeace for defamation because of its report "The Untouchables - Rimbunan Hijau’s World of Forest Crime and Political Patronage" demanding that the group withdraw the paper. Greenpeace has declined to comply.

Citibank, following a review of its own environmental policies in 2005, declared that it would require the client Rimbunan Hijau to obtain credible, independent, third party certification for its Papua New Guinea operations in the future.

References

 
 Greenpeace Forest Crime file: Rimbunan Hijau
 Rimbunan Hijau at SourceWatch

External links
 

1975 establishments in Malaysia
Multinational companies headquartered in Malaysia
Forest products companies
Renewable resource companies established in 1975
Privately held companies of Malaysia
Malaysian companies established in 1975